Barbados competed in the 2011 Commonwealth Youth Games (officially known as the IV Commonwealth Youth Games) held in the British Crown Dependency of Isle of Man from September 7 to 13, 2011. The nation was represented by the Barbados Olympic Association, which is responsible for the Commonwealth Games and Commonwealth Youth Games in Barbados.

Barbados sent a delegation of 13 athletes, who participated in five different sports—athletics, badminton, boxing, cycling, and swimming. Barbados earned only one bronze medal in the Games, won by Kion Joseph in 400 m hurdles event of athletics. Barbados ranked 22nd and finished last in the medal table of the Games, a position shared with nine other Commonwealth Games Associations.

Background
Barbados is participating in the Commonwealth Games since their first appearance at the 1954 British Empire and Commonwealth Games held in Vancouver, in the province of British Columbia in Canada. The Barbados Olympic Association, the country's National Olympic Committee, is responsible for the Commonwealth and Commonwealth Youth Games in Barbados. Barbados participated in the inaugural Games hosted by the Scottish city of Edinburgh in 2000. Barbados did not send its delegation for the 2004 Commonwealth Youth Games held in Bendigo, Australia. At the previous edition of the Games in Pune, the country had a delegation of ten athletes (six men and four women). Barbados succeeded in winning a gold in athletics, which came from 100 m hurdles women event. With this gold medal, Barbados finished at 17th position in the final medal standings, the position it shared with Grenada and Guernsey.

Athletics

Three athletes participated for Barbados in athletics. Jerrad Mason competed in 800 m, he took a time of 2:08.01 in his heat and qualified for the semifinal. In the semifinal, Mason was eliminated from the competition after finishing sixth. Kion Joseph ranked first in his heat of 400 m with a time of 54.56. He earned a bronze medal for his nation after taking a time of 53.52 in the final. The sole female athlete to represent Barbados in athletics was Sonia Gaskin, who failed to get through her heat round. Gaskin took a time of 2:19.10 and finished third in her heat.
Men

Women

Badminton

Two Barbadian athletes, Jevon Gaskin and Monyata Riviera, participated in badminton. Both the players received a bye in their first round matches of singles. None of the players advanced past the first round. Gaskin lost to Reneshan Naidoo of South Africa by a points difference of 4–21, 11–21. Riviera lost to Welsh Jordan Hart by a points difference of 7–21, 3–21. Gaskin and Riviera paired up for mixed doubles; they succeeded against a Kiribati pair of Mikaere Ramuz and Teitiria Utimawa. The pair lost to Nelson Heg and Meng yean Lee of Malaysia in the second round by a points difference of 5–21, 13–21.

Boxing

Two pugilists—Tahj Farley and Leonard Harewood—competed for Barbados in boxing in the bantamweight and middleweight classes, respectively. Both the players were eliminated after losing their first round matches. Farley lost to Obedy Mutapa of Zambia by a points difference of 5–19. Dylan Hardy of Australia defeated Harewood by a points difference of 19 to 10.

Cycling

Two cyclists represented Barbados. Both Russell Elcock and Brandon Wilkie competed in the same three events (time trial, road race and criterium). They also participated in team time trial event and finished in 10th position.
Men

Swimming
Barbados entered four swimmers—one man and three women. Zabrina Holder was the most successful female swimmer from Barbadian side. She was the only Barbadian female swimmer who advanced beyond the preliminary round and competed in the final, finishing sixth in the 100 m butterfly event. Amara Gibbs reached the final of 200 m butterfly, but did not start her event. Another woman swimmer, Lee-Ann Rose, failed to advance to the finals of any of her events. Matthew Courtis was the only male swimmer from Barbados; he participated in six different events. His best performances came from 400 m individual medley and 200 m backstroke, ranking fifth and seventh in the finals of the respective events.
Men

Women

Notes and references
Notes

The Commonwealth Games were initially known as the British Empire Games and were renamed to the British Empire and Commonwealth Games in 1954 and the British Commonwealth Games in 1970, before finally gaining their current title for the 1978 edition.

References

Nations at the 2011 Commonwealth Youth Games
Commonwealth Youth Games